Pilosocereus multicostatus is a species of plant in the family Cactaceae. It is endemic to Brazil, in northern Minas Gerais state.  Its natural habitat are rocky areas. It is threatened by habitat loss.

References

multicostatus
Cacti of South America
Endemic flora of Brazil
Flora of Minas Gerais
Near threatened flora of South America
Taxonomy articles created by Polbot
Plants described in 1979